Turris babylonia, common name: the Babylon turrid or tower turrid, is a species of sea snail, a marine gastropod mollusk in the family Turridae, the turrids.

Synonyms
 Lophiotoma babylonia (Linnaeus, 1758)
 Murex babylonius Linne, 1758
 Pleurotoma babylonia Linnaeus, 1758
 Pleurotoma raffrayi Tapparone-Canefri, C.E., 1878
 Turris assyria Olivera, Seronay & Fedosov, 2010
 Turris imperfecti Röding, 1798
 Turris nobilis Röding, 1798
 Turris pulchra Röding, 1798
 Turris tornatum Röding, 1798

Distribution
This species occurs in the Pacific Ocean off the Philippines, Indonesia, the Solomon Islands, Papua New Guinea, Timor; in the Indian Ocean off Mauritius and the Mascarene Basin.

Description

The size of an adult shell varies between 63 mm and 100 mm. The shell shows somewhat angular whorls, caused by the greater prominence of one of the revolving ribs. Its sculpture shows large revolving ribs, with intermediate raised lines. The color of the shell is whitish, with large dark brown or nearly black spots upon the ribs.

Habitat
These tropical benthic gastropods can be found in subtidal zone on rocks and sand.

Biology
Embryos of Turris babylonia develop into free-swimming planktonic marine larvae (trocophore) and later into juvenile veligers. Adults feed on marine worms chased by means of their venom, similarly to the cone snails.

Bibliography
 Drivas, J. & M. Jay (1988). Coquillages de La Réunion et de l'île Maurice 
 Rosenberg, G. 1992. Encyclopedia of Seashells. Dorset: New York. 224 pp. page(s): 103
 Olivera B.M., Seronay R.A. & Fedosov A.E. (2010) Turris babylonia; re-evaluation of a species complex and description of Turris assyria, new species. Philippine Science Letters 3:46–58
 Kilburn R.N., Fedosov A.E. & Olivera B.M. (2012) Revision of the genus Turris Batsch, 1789 (Gastropoda: Conoidea: Turridae) with the description of six new species. Zootaxa 3244: 1–58.

References

External links
 Linnaeus, C. (1758). Systema Naturae per regna tria naturae, secundum classes, ordines, genera, species, cum characteribus, differentiis, synonymis, locis. Editio decima, reformata [10th revised edition, vol. 1: 824 pp. Laurentius Salvius: Holmiae]
 Röding, P. F. (1798). Museum Boltenianum sive Catalogus cimeliorum e tribus regnis naturæ quæ olim collegerat Joa. Fried Bolten, M. D. p. d. per XL. annos proto physicus Hamburgensis. Pars secunda continens Conchylia sive Testacea univalvia, bivalvia & multivalvia. Trapp, Hamburg. viii, 199 pp.
 Encyclopedia of life

babylonia
Gastropods described in 1758
Taxa named by Carl Linnaeus